The northern corroboree frog (Pseudophryne pengilleyi) is a species of Australian ground frog, native to southeastern Australia.

References

Pseudophryne
Amphibians described in 1985
Frogs of Australia
Amphibians of New South Wales